The House of Representatives of Nepal (the lower house of the Federal Parliament) has 165 constituencies, of which 165 elect a single member using first-past-the-post voting and one nationwide constituency that elects 110 members by proportional representation. The current constituencies are based on the Constituency Delimitation Commission (CDC) report submitted on 31 August 2017. According to the constitution, the new constituencies cannot be altered for another 20 years (until 2037) and cannot be challenged in any court of law.

Parliamentary constituencies

References

External links
District Wise Constituency Map

Constituencies of Nepal
 
Nepal
Constituencies